Harley (Mikael) Wallèn (born November 4, ?) is a Swedish-American actor, writer and director. He is best known for his work on the films Betrayed, Bennett's Song and Moving Parts.

Multi award-winning filmmaker and actor Harley Wallen has starred in over 40 feature films and TV shows with legendary stars such as Tom Sizemore, Tara Reed and John Savage among many others.

He started his journey as a Martial Artist early with Judo at age 7 and is now a 5th degree black belt. Harley also spent time learning other arts (Jiu-Jitsu, Tae Kwon - Do black-belts as well) and Mixed Martial Arts. His other love at a young age was dance as he was an outstanding break dancer in his teen years. His sheer talent and skill is what landed him his first opportunity in acting as a dancer at the syndicated Swedish TV cult hit 'Solstollarna'! Soon after, he realized he was bitten by the acting bug. Harley then moved from Sweden to the United States to boldly pursue his dreams. After a short stint these plans got sidetracked by business opportunities as Harley climbed various career ladders. After returning to acting It wasn't long before the roles started coming and the growth he had experienced in the business world started happening to him in the acting world. After the film incentives ended in Michigan, he decided to start making films of his own. Not having a film school background with only limited experience, he decided to go online to further his education in filmmaking and took several more classes and seminars in acting. Finally in 2016 Harley and his wife Kaiti formed the film production company 'Painted Creek Productions'. The one thing he really takes pride in is his commitment to the character he is playing regardless the size of the role or the paycheck. Harley is now writing, producing, acting and directing and has found his life's purpose.

Life and career
Harley was born in Sweden and started training in martial arts when he was 7 years old. He had his first opportunity in acting as a dancer at the Swedish television program Solstollarna. He later moved to the United States to pursue his career in acting. He is the founder of Painted Creek Productions. He is married to actress Kaiti Wallen.

Filmography

As Actor

 2020 - Agramon's Gate
 2019 - 'Abstruse 2019 - Eternal Code 2018 - Betrayed 2018 - Halt: The Motion Picture 2018 - Bennett's Song 2018 - Love Espionage: Spy Revenge 2017 - Georgy 2017 - Moving Parts 2017 - Pimps, Pastors, & Politicians 2017 - Stay 2017 - KNIGHTMARE 2017 - My Breaking Point 2016 - An American Abroad 2016 - Daylight 2016 - I Declare War 2016 - Indictment: Dead Witnesses Can't Talk 2016 - Model No. Human 2016 - Deceitful 2015 - Psychology of Murder 2015 - Ten Zero Zero 2015 - A Matter of Time 2015 - Set Me Free 2015 - Broken 2015 - Random 2014 - Number One Contender 2014 - Social Path 2013 - Love Interest 2011 - WXC Web Series 2008-2009 - Xtreme Cagefighting Championship 2009 - XCC on MyTV20 2009 - Cage Combat MMA 2008 - Donofrio MMA 1987 - Solstollarna''

Awards and nominations

References

External links
 

Living people
American film directors
American film producers
21st-century American male actors
Year of birth missing (living people)